Mike Ford (born January 30, 1959) is a former American football player.  He was a quarterback at Mesquite High School in Mesquite, Texas.  He played college football for the SMU Mustangs football team from 1977 to 1980.  As a sophomore in 1978, he led all NCAA major college players in both total offense yards (2,957), total offense per game (268.8 yards/game), and passing yards (3,007).  In 11 games during the 1978 season, he completed 224 of 389 passes for 3,007 passing yards, 17 touchdowns, and 23 interceptions for and SMU team that compiled a 4-6-1 record. Listed as a pre-season Heisman Trophy candidate in 1979, he never reached the same statistical levels, passing for 217 yards after sustaining a knee injury in 1979 season opener, and tallying 951 passing yards in 1980. He returned to SMU as a student 30 year later to obtain his degree.

After his college career, he played in the USFL for the San Antonio Gunslingers.

See also
 List of NCAA major college football yearly passing leaders
 List of NCAA major college football yearly total offense leaders

References

Living people
1959 births
American football quarterbacks
San Antonio Gunslingers players
SMU Mustangs football players
Players of American football from Texas
People from Clarksville, Texas
Mesquite High School (Texas) alumni